The Mangapapa River is a river of the Manawatū-Whanganui region of New Zealand's North Island. The river rises near the remote settlement of Mangapapa, northwest of Mangaweka. It flows westward through heavily eroded hilly farmland to meet the Turakina River. There is a  waterfall on the lower reaches of the river.

See also
List of rivers of New Zealand

References

 NZ 1:50000 Topographic Map sheet BK34 - Pohonui.

Rivers of Manawatū-Whanganui